The Capture of Algiers occurred when forces from the Kingdom of Kuku led an expedition to capture the city from Barbarossa.

The capture of the city resulted in a period in which the King of Kuku reigned there for several years. Qara Hasan who was the former Agha, came to an agreement which resulted in him settling in Cherchell and reigning from there to the coast of Tipaza. This event occurred not long after the King of Kuku participated in the Battle of Isser and defeated the Regency of Algiers alongside the Hafsids.

References 

History of Algiers